Terrence McNally: Every Act of Life is a 2018 documentary film about playwright Terrence McNally. It was directed, produced and written by Jeff Kaufman, and produced by Marcia S. Ross. It premiered at the Tribeca Film Festival in April 2018. It will be distributed by The Orchard in November 2018. An expanded and illustrated version of the script will be published by Smith and Kraus in October 2018. Terrence McNally: Every Act of Life aired June 14, 2019 on PBS’ “American Masters.”

Synopsis 
Every Act Of Life is a documentary that profiles four-time Tony-winning playwright Terrence McNally's six ground-breaking decades in the theatre, the fight for LGBTQ rights, triumph over addiction, the pursuit of love, and inspiration at every age, and the power of the arts to transform society.

The son of an alcoholic beer distributor in southern Texas, Terrence McNally graduated from Columbia in 1960, traveled the world as tutor to John Steinbeck's children (Steinbeck's only advice was, "Don't write for the theater. It will break your heart”); suffered an infamous Broadway flop in 1965 at age 24; and went on to write dozens of groundbreaking plays and musicals about sexuality, homophobia, faith, the power of art, the need to connect, and finding meaning in every moment of life. Six-time Tony-winning actress Audra McDonald said, “Terrence gets to the truth in a way that makes you laugh and cry in all different areas – musical theatre and plays. I defy you to name another playwright who can do that. You cannot tell the history of American theatre without celebrating his life and work.” Attorney and LGBTQ activist Roberta Kaplan said, “Terrence started so early to show Americans who gay people are. He did it before anyone else. He did it better than anyone else.” McNally had long relationships with playwrights Edward Albee and Wendy Wasserstein; lost a lover and many friends to AIDS; stopped drinking through the intervention of Angela Lansbury; helped launch the careers of Nathan Lane, F. Murray Abraham, Audra McDonald, Doris Roberts, Patrick Wilson, and Joe Mantello; was an early champion of marriage equality and faced violent protests for his play Corpus Christi; survived Stage 3 lung cancer; and married theatre producer Tom Kirdahy.

Terrence's plays, musicals, operas, and screenplays include: And Things That Go Bump in the Night (1964), Next (1969), Bad Habits (1974), The Ritz (1975), Frankie and Johnny in the Clair de Lune (1982), It's Only a Play (1986/2014), Andre's Mother (1990), The Lisbon Traviata (1989), Lips Together, Teeth Apart (1991), Kiss of the Spider Woman (1992), A Perfect Ganesh (1993), Love! Valour! Compassion! (1994), Master Class (1995), Ragtime (1996), Corpus Christi (1998), Dead Man Walking (2000), The Full Monty (2000), Mothers and Sons (2014), and Anastasia (2017).

Cast 
Cast:

F. Murray Abraham
Lynn Ahrens
Jon Robin Baitz
Christine Baranski
Dan Bucatinsky (an excerpt from “Bad Habits”)
Zoe Caldwell
Bryan Cranston (voice of John Steinbeck)
Dominic Cuskern
Tyne Daly
Jason Danieley
Edie Falco
Stephen Flaherty
John Glover
Anthony Heald
Sheryl Kaller
John Kander
Roberta Kaplan
Tom Kirdahy
Larry Kramer
Nathan Lane
Angela Lansbury
Paul Libin
Joe Mantello
Marin Mazzie
Audra McDonald
Peter McNally
Terrence McNally
Lynne Meadow
Rita Moreno
Jack O'Brien
Billy Porter
Chita Rivera
Doris Roberts
Don Roos
John Slattery
Micah Stock
Meryl Streep (as Terrence’s high school English teacher)
Richard Thomas
John Tillinger
Patrick Wilson

Press 
Every Act Of Life won the Freedom Award and Best Documentary at FilmOut San Diego, and Best Documentary and the Audience Award at the Connecticut LGBT Film Festival. It has also screened at dozens of other film festivals. The Village Voice review of the film said, “I wasn’t prepared for the emotional release of Every Act of Life (written and directed by Jeff Kaufman), a wonderful documentary on the prolific playwright Terrence McNally. McNally’s life has the sweep of an epic novel, except that the novel’s inevitable movie version could never have as much star power as his life did.” The Hollywood Reporter review said, “Terrence McNally receives a warm salute as a vital voice in the American theater and an LGBT activist who made the personal political. Jeff Kaufman's briskly entertaining film will be met with heartfelt applause from theater-lovers and LGBT audiences.” Every Act of Life had its premiere at the Tribeca Film Festival (NYC) on April 23, 2018. The premiere included a post-screening discussion moderated by Frank Rich. The panelists included Terrence McNally, Jeff Kaufman, F. Murray Abraham, Tyne Daly, Nathan Lane, and Joe Mantello.

Festivals 

 aGLIFF 2018 (Austin, TX) - September 6, 2018
 Denver Film Society - July 22, 2018
 FilmOut (San Diego, CA) - June 10, 2018 
 Frameline San Francisco International LGBTQ Film Festival - June 16, 2018
 GAZE International LGBT Film Festival (Dublin) - August 6, 2018
 Inside Out (Toronto) - May 26, 2018
 Nashville Film Festival (Nashville, TN) - May 16 & 17, 2018 
 North Carolina Gay & Lesbian Film Festival - August 16, August 18, & August 20, 2018
 Outfest: Los Angeles LGBT Film Festival - July 15 & 22, 2018
 Out Film Connecticut (Hartford, CT) - June 9, 2018 
 OUT HERE NOW: The Kansas City LGBT Film Festival - June 24, 2018
 Out on Screen: Vancouver Queer Film Festival - August 10, 2018 
 OUTshine Film Festival (Miami) - April 29, 2018
 Provincetown International Film Festival - June 14 & 15, 2018
 QDoc Film Festival (Portland, OR) - May 20, 2018
 Seattle International Film Festival (Seattle, WA) - May 31 & June 2, 2018
 TLVFest (Tel Aviv, Israel) - May 31 & June 9, 2018
 Tribeca Film Festival (NYC) - April 23 to April 26, 2018

References

External links
 

2018 films
2018 documentary films
American documentary films
Documentary films about playwrights
2010s English-language films
2010s American films